Hombolo is an administrative ward in the Dodoma Urban district of the Dodoma Region of Tanzania. In 2016 the Tanzania National Bureau of Statistics report there were 14,748 people in the ward, from 22,457 in 2012 before Hombolo Makulu split off.

References

Dodoma
Wards of Dodoma Region